Fredrik Isaksson (born 1971, in Stockholm), also known as "Freddan", is a Swedish bass player in Subztain, Berzerker Legion and Dark Funeral. He has also previously been a member of heavy metal bands: Therion (in 1994), Grave and Excruciate.

References 

 
 

Therion (band) members
Musicians from Stockholm
Swedish heavy metal bass guitarists
1971 births
Living people
21st-century bass guitarists